The Chinese Psychological Society is a non-profit academic organization, established by a group of psychologists in China. It was founded in 1921 and it is one of the earliest established national organizations in China, aiming at uniting all the psychologists to work and promote in the field of psychology.

Functions 
 Organizing academic exchanges between different countries and holding academic meetings.
 Studying psychological subjects.
 Popularizing basic theories in this field and propagating the spirits, ideas and methods of science.
 Compiling and publishing psychological magazines.
 Holding tutorial classes.
 Awarding the membership to major contributors in psychological study.

Organizational structure 
Chinese Psychological Society contains studies in every branch of psychology. The total number of membership is nearly 9000. There are local Psychological Societies in 31 provinces and provincial districts.

It publishes the journals  Psychological Science and Acta Psychologica Sinica.

References 

Learned societies of China
Non-profit organizations based in China
Scientific organizations established in 1921
1921 establishments in China